Boorowa was an electoral district of the Legislative Assembly in the Australian State of New South Wales from 1880 to 1904, including the town of Boorowa. Its name was spelt "Booroowa" from 1899 to 1901. It was abolished in the 1904 re-distribution of electorates following the 1903 New South Wales referendum, which required the number of members of the Legislative Assembly to be reduced from 125 to 90, and was largely absorbed by Yass, with the balance going to the new district of Burrangong.

Members for Boorowa

Election results

References

Former electoral districts of New South Wales
Constituencies established in 1880
1880 establishments in Australia
Constituencies disestablished in 1904
1904 disestablishments in Australia